Pasquali may refer to:

People 
 Alberto Pasquali (1882–1929), Italian stage and film actor of the silent era
 Alfred-Adolphe Pasquali (1898-1991), French actor and theatre director
 Bernice de Pasquali (1873–1925), American coloratura soprano singer and pianist
 Ernesto Maria Pasquali (1883–1919), Italian pioneering film producer and director
 Filippo Pasquali (1651-1697), Italian painter of the Baroque period, mainly painting sacred subjects
 Francesca Pasquali (born 1980), Italian artist
 Giorgio Pasquali (1885–1952), Italian classical scholar 
 Giovanni Battista Pasquali, a leading Italian printer in eighteenth-century
 Giovannuccio Pasquali (died 1471), Italian Roman Catholic Bishop of Nusco 
 Ivan Paskvali (Cattaro 1586 - ? ), Catholic missionary who was in charge for Catholicization of Orthodox Serbs, first in Dalmatia and then in Montenegro and Serbia.
 Jacques Pasquali, actor in the 2016 French comedy film Raid dingue
 Johanna Pasquali, actress in the 2016 French comedy film Raid dingue
 Ludovico Pasquali (c.1500-1551), an Italian-language author
 Scipione Pasquali (died 1624), Italian Roman Catholic Bishop of Casale Monferrato
 Sebastian Pasquali, Australian footballer
 Tiziano Pasquali (born 1994), Italian rugby union footballer

See also
 Pascal (disambiguation)
 Pasqual (disambiguation)
 Pascual (disambiguation)
 Pasquale (disambiguation)